Sékou or Sekou Camara may refer to:
 Sékou Camara (footballer, born 1985)
 Sekou Camara (footballer, born 1997)
 Sekou Camara (judoka)
 Sekou Camara (athlete)